Alastair Duncan (born February 7, 1958) is a Scottish actor and real estate broker. He is best known for his voice-work in animation, films and video games.

Early life 
Duncan was born in Edinburgh, Scotland. His father is named Archibald Alexander Macbeth Duncan. Following Scottish naming traditions, his name would have been Alastair David Macbeth Duncan, but his father decided to simply give him the legal name Alastair Duncan.

Career
Duncan's breakout role (then credited as "Neil Duncan") was as Peter Livingstone, side-kick to Mark McManus' Taggart in Scottish television's eponymous detective series.

Leaving the show after the first two series, Duncan then appeared in the 1988 television adaptation of The Hound of the Baskervilles, starring Jeremy Brett as Sherlock Holmes.

Duncan's next key role was in the 1992 science fiction film Split Second. He continued with guest roles on television series, such as Babylon 5, All-American Girl, and The Marshal. He also appeared in television films, such as Trick of the Eye and Tower of Terror.

Since the early 2000s, he has been doing voiceover work, including films like Batman Unlimited: Animal Instincts and video games like Warlords Battlecry, Legacy of Kain: Defiance, X-Men Legends II: Rise of Apocalypse, Tomb Raider: Legend, Tomb Raider: Anniversary, Final Fantasy XIV, Mass Effect, Infinity Blade II, Infinity Blade III, Metal Gear Rising: Revengeance and Middle-earth: Shadow of Mordor, as well as animated television series: Alfred Pennyworth in The Batman and Adrian Toomes in Marvel's Spider-Man.

His most notable television guest appearances include episodes of Tracey Takes On..., Buffy the Vampire Slayer, Charmed, Angel and Leverage.

Duncan was one of 400 actors considered for the lead role in the international hit series Highlander: The Series but lost out to Adrian Paul. He later guest-starred in the fifth season's episode "Dramatic License" as immortal Terence Coventry.

In 2011, Duncan appeared in David Fincher's The Girl with the Dragon Tattoo. Duncan has also provided his voice for How to Train Your Dragon 2 and acted in the HBO series Westworld. He has also voiced and performed motion capture for the Norse god Mimir in 2018's God of War and its sequel God of War Ragnarök.

Personal life 

In 1994, after beginning to find regular work as an actor, Duncan relocated from the United Kingdom to Los Angeles, California. According to one interview, he happened to move two weeks before the Northridge earthquake.

Duncan was married to actress Anna Gunn, but the couple divorced in 2009. They share two daughters.

Filmography

Film

Television

Video games

References

External links 

Living people
British real estate businesspeople
Scottish male film actors
Scottish male stage actors
Scottish male television actors
Scottish male video game actors
Scottish male voice actors
20th-century Scottish male actors
21st-century Scottish male actors
People from Edinburgh
Male actors from Edinburgh
1958 births